The International Journal of Digital Multimedia Broadcasting is a peer-reviewed scientific journal covering all aspects of digital broadcasting technology. It was established in 2007 by Fa-Long Luo, who served as founding editor-in-chief until 2011. The journal is published by Hindawi Publishing Corporation.

Abstracting and indexing 
The journal is abstracted and indexed in:

External links
 

Engineering journals
Hindawi Publishing Corporation academic journals
Publications established in 2007
Open access journals
English-language journals